The Kent State Golden Flashes Men's Ice Hockey was an NCAA Division I ice hockey team from 1980-1994. Kent State hockey was promoted to Division I status by the Board of Trustees on June 12, 1980, following ten years as a club sport. The program joined fellow independent Notre Dame to form the American Collegiate Hockey Association from 1986-89 (not to be confused with the ACHA formed in 1991). After a 19-win campaign in his third season with the club John Wallin left to take over the Sudbury Wolves of the Ontario Hockey League in 1987. After Kent State alum Tom Viggiano headed the program for the 1987–88 season, Bill Switaj was brought in once it was confirmed that the program would continue to exist beyond 1988 despite budgetary concerns. The program's entire season was cancelled that September in response to a hazing incident.

The Golden Flashes would finally debut with Switaj as their coach in 1989. After three seasons they were eventually accepted into the Central Collegiate Hockey Association (CCHA) but Kent State's program ended in the spring of 1994 when university president Carol Cartwright made a recommendation to the board of trustees that the program be discontinued.

Season-by-season results

Golden Flashes in the NHL

References